Patricio Martínez García (born March 17, 1948 Chihuahua, Chihuahua, Mexico) is a Mexican politician and member of the Institutional Revolutionary Party (PRI). Martínez served as the Governor of Chihuahua, in northern Mexico, from 1998 until 2004.

Martinez was born in the city of Chihuahua, Mexico. He is married to Patricia Aguirre Rodríguez, and has four children - Patricia, Patricio, César Iván, and Elisa Ivonne. He graduated from the Monterrey Institute of Technology and Higher Education.

He began working as a professor of accounting at the Autonomous University of Chihuahua in 1971. Martinez became the chairman of the Business Coordinating Council of Chihuahua in 1991.

Martinez served as the General Director of Administration for the state of Chihuahua from 1991 to 1992. He was elected mayor of the city of Chihuahua, holding the office from 1992 to 1995. He was further elected to the Chamber of Deputies of Mexico in 1997, serving during the LVII meeting of the federal congress.

References

Living people
1948 births
Governors of Chihuahua (state)
Members of the Chamber of Deputies (Mexico) for Chihuahua (state)
Monterrey Institute of Technology and Higher Education alumni
People from Chihuahua City
Institutional Revolutionary Party politicians
20th-century Mexican politicians
21st-century Mexican politicians
Municipal presidents of Chihuahua
Politicians from Chihuahua (state)
Deputies of the LVII Legislature of Mexico
Members of the Senate of the Republic (Mexico) for Chihuahua (state)
Senators of the LXII and LXIII Legislatures of Mexico